Runa Reta (born December 14, 1980) is a Canadian former professional squash player, who competed on the women's tour. She has left Bermuda and Patrick Foster has assumed the duties of her role.

External links 
 
 
 

1980 births
Living people
Canadian female squash players
Competitors at the 2005 World Games
Pan American Games bronze medalists for Canada
Pan American Games gold medalists for Canada
Pan American Games medalists in squash
Sportspeople from Ottawa
Squash players at the 2007 Pan American Games
Squash players at the 2011 Pan American Games
Medalists at the 2007 Pan American Games
21st-century Canadian women